Hello Again may refer to the following:

 Hello Again, a 1984 album by Howard Carpendale, and the title song
 "Hello Again" (Neil Diamond song), a song by Neil Diamond from the 1980 The Jazz Singer
 "Hello Again" (The Cars song), a song by The Cars from the 1984 album Heartbeat City
 "Hello Again", a song by Lostprophets from the 2004 album Start Something
 "Hello Again", a song by the Dave Matthews Band from the 2005 album Stand Up
 Hello Again (musical), a 1994 off-Broadway musical by Michael John LaChuisa, based on Arthur Schintzler's play "La Ronde"  
 Hello Again (1987 film), a 1987 comedy film starring Shelley Long and Corbin Bernsen
 Hello Again (2017 film), a 2017 musical film starring Audra McDonald, based on Michael John LaChuisa's musical